is a subway station on the Tokyo Metro Ginza Line in Chūō, Tokyo, Japan, operated by the Tokyo subway operator Tokyo Metro. It is numbered "G-10".

Lines

Station layout
The station has one underground island platform, located on the 2nd basement (B2F) level, serving by two tracks.

Platforms

History
Kyobashi Station opened on 24 December 1932.

The station facilities were inherited by Tokyo Metro after the privatization of the Teito Rapid Transit Authority (TRTA) in 2004.

Passenger statistics
In fiscal 2012, the station was used by an average of 43,576 passengers daily.

Surrounding area
 Meidi-Ya main store

Stations
 Takaracho Station
 Tokyo Station
 Yurakucho Station

Hotels

Corporate headquarters
 Meiji Holdings head office
 Sumitomo Dainippon Pharma Tokyo head office

See also
 List of railway stations in Japan

References

External links

 

Stations of Tokyo Metro
Railway stations in Tokyo
Tokyo Metro Ginza Line
Railway stations in Japan opened in 1932